The Amur Bay Bridge is the low-water bridge in Vladivostok, Russia, that connects the De Frieze Peninsula with the vicinity of the Sedanka microdistrict (микрорайон Седанка) of the Muravyov-Amursky Peninsula, and is part of the highway “Novy Village (Новый) - Peninsula De Friz (Де-Фриз) - Sedanka Station (Седанка) - Patroclus Bay (Патрокл)”. It is one of the three large bridges completed for the 2012 APEC Summit in Vladivostok, the other two being the Russky Bridge and the Zolotoy Bridge.

Specifics of the bridge
Length of the bridge - 4,364 meters
Number of lanes - 4
Transport levels - 1
Maximum speed - 90 kilometers per hour
The four-lane highway has become an alternative exit from the city. A new type of lighting system was implemented on the bridge - about 260 LED lamps  manufactured by GreenEC were installed.

Project history
The construction of the bridge began in November 2009 in preparation for the 2012 APEC Summit in Vladivostok. The Pacific Bridge Construction Company («Тихоокеанская мостостроительная компания») acted as the general contractor. The grand opening and commissioning of the facility took place on August 11, 2012.

It is now part of Federal Highway A370, from Khabarovsk to Vladivostok.

See also 
 List of longest bridges
 List of longest bridges in Russia (Список самых длинных мостов России)

References

External links 

The Low-Water Bridge Across Amur Bay (in Russian)

Buildings and structures in Vladivostok
Transport in Vladivostok
Bridges completed in 2012
2012 establishments in Russia
Cross-sea bridges in Asia
Road bridges in Russia
Pacific Coast of Russia
Cross-sea bridges in Russia